Abu al-Ala Idris al-Ma'mun (Abū Al-`lā Al-Mā'mūn Idrīs ibn Al-Manṣūr; died 16 or 17 October 1232) was an Almohad rival caliph who reigned in part of the empire from 1229 until his death. He was a son of Abu Yusuf Yaqub al-Mansur and brother of Muhammad al-Nasir and Abdallah al-Adil.

Life 
At the death of Abdallah, a civil war broke out between Idris and his nephew Yahya, who had the support of the capital Marrakesh. Idris asked Ferdinand III of Castile for help, receiving 12,000 knights who allowed him to conquer that city and to massacre the sheikhs that had supported Yahya.

Idris abandoned the Mahdi doctrine, in favour of the Sunni one. He went so far as to claim that the Mahdi was Jesus and not Ibn Tumart, the founder of his dynasty. This sacrilege caused the break away of the Hafsid dynasty in the Ifriqiya province. Following his victory, Idris honored the treaty with Ferdinand III and allowed the construction of a Christian church in Marrakesh in 1230, which was destroyed two years later by Yahya. The side changes of Idris soon lost him popular consent. In the early 1232, when he was besieging Ceuta, Yahya took the occasion to capture Marrakesh. Idris died during the march to reach the city, and was succeeded by his son Abd al-Wahid II.

Idris’ other son was Abu al-Hasan as-Said al-Mutadid.

Notes

References

Sources

1232 deaths
13th-century Almohad caliphs
13th-century Berber people
People from Marrakesh
Year of birth unknown